Paul Joseph Yesawich, Jr. (November 27, 1923 – December 13, 2017) was an American basketball player who played in the United States' National Basketball League in five games for the Syracuse Nationals. Yesawich was also a New York attorney, legal scholar and judge, serving as a justice of the Appellate Division of the New York State Supreme Court, First Judicial Department from 1974 to 1981.

References

1923 births
2017 deaths
American men's basketball players
United States Navy personnel of World War II
Basketball players from New York City
Cornell Law School alumni
Forwards (basketball)
New York (state) lawyers
New York (state) state court judges
Niagara Purple Eagles men's basketball players
People from Cortland, New York
Sportspeople from Brooklyn
Syracuse Nationals players
Brooklyn Technical High School alumni
20th-century American judges
20th-century American lawyers
United States Navy officers